Megyer may refer to:

 Megyer, Hungary, village in Hungary
 A Hungarian tribe, see 
 An early name of Békásmegyer, Budapest, Hungary
 An early name of Bábonymegyer, Somogy County, Hungary
 Nagymegyer (Great Megyer), the Hungarian name of Veľký Meder, Slovakia

See also
 
 Megyeri Bridge, bridge in Budapest
 Magyar (disambiguation)